Bobby Reynolds was the defending champion. He was first-seeded player in the main draw, but he lost to José de Armas 4–6, 6–2, 2–6 in first round.
Benjamin Becker became the new champion, after he won 6–2, 3–6, 6–4, against Rajeev Ram in final.

Seeds

Draw

Final four

Top half

Bottom half

References
 Main Draw
 Qualifying Draw

2009 ATP Challenger Tour
2009,Singles